Shahrak-e Shahid Dastgheyb (also Romanized as Shahrak-e Shahīd Dastgheyb; also known as Shahrak-e Dastgheyb) is a village in Jaydasht Rural District, in the Central District of Firuzabad County, Fars Province, Iran. At the 2006 census, its population was 883, in 188 families.

References 

Populated places in Firuzabad County